Willy De Geest (born 8 January 1947) is a Belgian former professional racing cyclist. He rode in the 1973 Tour de France and the 1976 Tour de France.

References

External links
 

1947 births
Living people
Belgian male cyclists
Sportspeople from Ghent
Cyclists from East Flanders
Tour de Suisse stage winners